The Flight into Egypt is a c.1570 painting of the Flight into Egypt by El Greco, now in the Museo del Prado in Madrid. It is one of his earliest works, dating to his stay in Venice, and shows the major influence of Tintoretto and Jacopo Bassano, especially in the landscape background. The clouds and the chromaticism are similar to his Healing of the Man Born Blind, though most of the tonalities show the influence of Raphael and Michelangelo.

Bibliography (in Spanish)
 ÁLVAREZ LOPERA, José, El Greco, Madrid, Arlanza, 2005, Biblioteca «Descubrir el Arte», (colección «Grandes maestros»). .
 SCHOLZ-HÄNSEL, Michael, El Greco, Colonia, Taschen, 2003. .
 http://www.museodelprado.es/coleccion/galeria-on-line/galeria-on-line/obra/la-huida-a-egipto/
 http://www.museodelprado.es/enciclopedia/enciclopedia-on-line/voz/huida-a-egipto-la-el-greco/

1570s paintings
Paintings by El Greco in the Museo del Prado
El Greco
Donkeys in art